Events from the year 1964 in Pakistan.

Incumbents 
President: Ayub Khan
Chief Justice: A.R. Cornelius

Events
 January 25 ; In East Pakistan, Sheikh Mujibur Rahman revives 'Awami League' in his residence at 32,Dhanmondi,Dhaka & forms "All Party Revolution Committee " against Ayub Khan Government.

 December 19 : Sheikh Mujibur Rahman is arrested for treason & offensive remarks against the state.

Births
 August 4 – Ghulam Murtaza Baloch, politician (d. 2020)
 August 14 – Hussain Shah Syed, boxer
 December 24 – Shahid Ali Khan, field hockey goalkeeper

See also
 1963 in Pakistan
 Other events of 1964
 1965 in Pakistan
 List of Pakistani films of 1964
 Timeline of Pakistani history

 
1964 in Asia